Company.com is an online company that provides services and resources to business owners. The company was founded in 2009 and is based in Atlanta, Georgia.

Services provided by Company.com include websites, email, tech support, job postings, small business insurance, business listing reports, team collaboration, equipment protection plans. payment processing, directory listings, business listing managers, hiring, and business funding. The founder and CEO of Company.com is Bill Wade. In 2015, the company was ranked the tenth on the Inc. 5000, which is a list of the 5,000 fastest growing private companies in the United States. In 2016, they were ranked fifth on the Inc. 5000.

References 

Companies based in Atlanta
Privately held companies based in Georgia (U.S. state)
2009 establishments in Georgia (U.S. state)